Viola nemoralis is a species of flowering plant belonging to the family Violaceae.

It is native to Europe to Mongolia, Morocco.

References

nemoralis